Cordylophora is the sole genus of hydrozoans in the monotypic family Cordylophoridae.

Species
The World Register of Marine Species includes the following species in the genus :

Cordylophora caspia (Pallas, 1771)
Cordylophora solangiae Redier, 1967

References

Cordylophoridae
Hydrozoan genera
Taxa named by George Allman (natural historian)